Christophe Boan is a French curler.

At the national level, he is a three-time French men's champion curler and a two-time French junior men's champion curler.

Teams

References

External links

Living people
French male curlers
French curling champions
Date of birth missing (living people)
Place of birth missing (living people)
Year of birth missing (living people)